"Something in Your Eyes" is a song co-produced and performed by American contemporary R&B group Bell Biv DeVoe, issued as the second single from the group's second studio album, Hootie Mack. It was the only song from the album to chart on the US Billboard Hot 100, peaking at number 38 in 1993.

Music video

The official music video for the song was directed by Lionel C. Martin.

Charts

Weekly charts

Year-end charts

Release history

References

External links
 
 

1993 singles
1993 songs
Bell Biv DeVoe songs
MCA Records singles
Music videos directed by Lionel C. Martin
Song recordings produced by Babyface (musician)
Song recordings produced by Daryl Simmons
Song recordings produced by L.A. Reid
Song recordings produced by Michael Bivins
Song recordings produced by Ricky Bell (singer)
Song recordings produced by Ronnie DeVoe
Songs written by Babyface (musician)